is a Japanese manga series written and illustrated by Hiyoko Kobayashi. It started in the supplementary edition of Shueisha's seinen manga magazine Weekly Young Jump, Young Jump Zōkan Mankaku in January 2001, before being transferred to the main magazine in October of the same year, and finished in April 2007. Its chapters were collected in 13 volumes. The series centers on a couple whose age difference makes it difficult for them to further their relationship, as one is a high school girl and the other is her physics teacher.

A video game based on the series was released for the PlayStation 2 and later the Dreamcast as a "Director's Edition", both in 2002. A 13-episode anime television series adaptation, produced by Avex Entertainment and Madhouse, was broadcast from July to September 2005, with each episode composed of two mini-episodes.

Plot
 is a seventeen-year-old high-school student (voiced by Ayako Kawasumi) with a secret which has not been revealed to anyone: she is already married. Her husband,  (voiced by Mitsuaki Madono), is a physics teacher in the same high school as her. However, even though they are officially a married couple, Asami's father forbids them to have any sexual contact until after Asami has graduated. Asami has to hide the fact that she is married to Kyosuke while trying desperately to further their relationship, and it does not help when there are so many obstacles from her father and other third parties.

Media

Manga
It was later transferred to the main magazine on October 4, 2001, and finished on April 19, 2007. Shueisha released first a limited tankōbon volume on June 20, 2002, and started publishing it in wideban volumes on November 20 of the same year. The thirteenth and last volume was published on June 20, 2007.

Anime

Episodes

See also
Peridot, another manga series by the same author
Hantsu × Trash, another manga series by the same author

Notes

References

External links
Anime official website 

2002 manga
Anime series based on manga
Madhouse (company)
Manga series
Seinen manga
Shueisha franchises
Shueisha manga